Oceanisphaera ostreae is a Gram-negative, non-spore-forming and motile bacterium from the genus of Oceanisphaera which has been isolated from seawater from an oyster farm from the South Sea in Korea.

References

External links
Type strain of Oceanisphaera ostreae at BacDive -  the Bacterial Diversity Metadatabase

Aeromonadales
Bacteria described in 2011